Intech may refer to:
 INTECH, an educational resource company
 Lincoln InTech engine, a branded version of the Ford Modular engine
 Intech Contracting
 IDBI Intech Ltd
 InTech Collegiate Academy

See also 
 Intec (disambiguation)